Anthidium philorum is a species of bee in the family Megachilidae, the leaf-cutter, carder, or mason bees.

Synonyms
Synonyms for this species include:
Anthidium philorum var abbotti Cockerell, 1911

References

philorum
Insects described in 1910